Thirty Day Princess is a 1934 pre-Code comedy film directed by Marion Gering and starring Sylvia Sidney, Cary Grant and Edward Arnold. The film was based on a story of the same name by Clarence Budington Kelland (which appeared in Ladies' Home Journal in 1933), adapted by Sam Hellman and Edwin Justus Mayer, and written by Preston Sturges and Frank Partos.

Plot
On her way to New York to find financial backing for her impoverished country, the Ruritanian Kingdom of Taronia, Princess "Zizzi" Catterina (Sylvia Sidney) falls ill with the mumps and has to be quarantined for a month. In desperation, financier Richard Gresham (Edward Arnold), who is planning to issue $50 million in Taronian bonds, hires unemployed lookalike actress Nancy Lane (also portrayed by Sidney) to impersonate the princess, and offers her a large bonus if she changes the mind of the chief opponent of the financial transaction, newspaper publisher Porter Madison III (Cary Grant).

Cast
 Sylvia Sidney as Princess Catterina/Nancy Lane
 Cary Grant as Porter Madison III
 Edward Arnold as Richard Gresham
 Henry Stephenson as King Anatol XII
 Vince Barnett as Count Nicholeus
 Edgar Norton as Baron Passeria 
 Ray Walker as Dan Kirk
 Lucien Littlefield as Parker
 Robert McWade as Managing editor
 George Baxter: Donald Spottswood
 Marguerite Namara as Lady-in-Waiting

Production
Production on Thirty Day Princess was to have begun on 28 February 1934, but was delayed because of the illness of William Collier Sr., who was scheduled to play the role of the "Managing editor".  Collier was replaced and production began on 1 March.

Although Preston Sturges received a writing credit for the film's screenplay, he wrote in his autobiography that "not much" of his work was actually used. Sturges also said of B.P. Schulberg that "as a producer, [he] was accustomed to accepting praise for pictures as generals accept praise for the valor of their soldiers, and it thus seemed logical to him that the writers should feel the same general sense of shared accomplishment." Thirty-Day Princess was released on 18 May 1934.

Reception
The film received a mixed reception. Meyer Levin of Esquire remarking that the director was "no man for comedy", and Cy Caldwell of New Outlook calling it a "jolly and amusing romantic comedy" in which Grant, Edward Arnold, Vince Barnett and others "render good support". Mordaunt Hall of The New York Times wrote, "This amiable light affair has a generous share of imaginative turns, and it is further endowed with a highly competent supporting cast."

Grant biographer Geoffrey Wansell notes that Grant was "required to do little more than spend most of his time wearing white tie and tails." He states that some of the more scathing reviews of the film "infuriated" Grant and that he subsequently demanded to choose his own roles. Wansell claims that Paramount retaliated by loaning him to United Artists.

References

Sources

External links
 
 
 
 

1934 films
1934 comedy films
American black-and-white films
Paramount Pictures films
American comedy films
Films directed by Marion Gering
Films produced by B. P. Schulberg
Films with screenplays by Preston Sturges
1930s American films